is a former Japanese football player.

Playing career
Mikami was born in Yaizu on June 12, 1969. After graduating from high school, he joined Mitsubishi Motors (later Urawa Reds) in 1988. Although he also played as left side back not only forward, he could not play many matches. He retired end of 1994 season.

Club statistics

References

External links

1969 births
Living people
Association football people from Shizuoka Prefecture
Japanese footballers
Japan Soccer League players
J1 League players
Urawa Red Diamonds players
Association football forwards